Jan Harbeck (born 13 April 1975 in Aarhus, Denmark) is a Danish jazz musician (saxophones, flaute, clarinet) and composer.

Biography 
Harbeck attended the Royal Academy of Music, Aarhus/Aalborg to study music and later went on to further studies at The New School in New York City. Besides two ensembles of his own, Jan Harbeck Quartet and Live Jive Jungle, he performs  with a series of other orchestras. In 2006 he was awarded the  Walter Klæbel Prize, in 2009 a Danish Grammy for Best album of the year, and in 2011 the prestigious Bent Jædig Prize.

With his own self titled quartet he released the album In the Still of the Night (2008), receiving a grammy at the Danish Music Awards. It was followed up by Copenhagen Nocturne in 2011. They play modern acoustic jazz with a mix of original compositions and jazz standards. In 2014 they released thetheir third album Variations in Blue with Walter Smith III.

Honors 

 2006: Awarded the Walter Klæbel Prize
 2008: Nominated New Danish Jazz Act of the Year at the Copenhagen Jazz Festival
 2009: Awarded the Danish Jazz Album of the Year 2008, for the album In the Still of the Night at the Danish Music Awards 
 2011: Awarded the Bent Jædig Prize
 2018: Awarded the Ben Webster Prize

Discography

Solo albums 
 2003: Landors (Cope Records), Harbeck/Agesen/Johnsen
 2005: HAVL – Who is it? (Twangster Records)
 2008: In the Still of the Night (Stunt Records), with Jan Harbeck Quartet
 2011: Copenhagen Nocturne (Stunt Records), with Jan Harbeck Quartet
 2014: Variations in Blue (Stunt Records), with Jan Harbeck Quartet feat. Walter Smith III
 2017: Elevate (Stunt Records), with Live Jive Jungle
 2019: The Sound The Rhythm (Stunt Records) with Jan Harbeck Quartet
 2022: Balanced (Stunt Records) with Jan Harbeck Quartet

Collaborations 
 With The Ernie Wilkins Almost Big Band
 2005: Kinda Dukish (Gazell Records), with Putte Wickman
 2007: Out Of This World (Stunt Records), with Bobo Moreno

 With The Orchestra
 2005: Pieces of Mind (Cope Records)
 2014: Money (Gateway Records)

 With Malene Kjærgård
 2013: Happy Feet (Calibrated Records)
 2016: Here’s To The Ladies (Calibrated Records)

 With others
 2004: Tango for Bad People (Sweet Silence Records), with the Beijbom Kroner Big Band
 2006: Tango jalousie and all that jazz (Calibrated Records), with the New Music Orchestra
 2006: Live from Paradise (Calibrated Records), with the Monday Night Big Band
 2007: Playground +1 (Calibrated Records), with Bévort-Schmidt 
 2008: EKMNO B3 (Calibrated Records), with New Music Orchestra
 2009: Turn on the heat (Little Beat Records), with the Ib Glindemann's Orchestra
 2010: Sparring (Gateway Records), with Dellbeck
 2011: Blues Modernism (Calibrated Records), with Snorre Kirk Sextet
 2011: Funkenstein (Do It Again Records), with the Bentzon Brotherhood
 2012: Free Falling (Calibrated Records), with Mads Mathias
 2013: Come Sunday (Music Mecca), with Kjeld Lauritsen and Espen Laub von Lillienskjold
 2014: WhiteAlive at the Metronome (Mighty Blue Records), with Franck White
 2015: Europa (Calibrated Records), with Snorre Kirk Quintet
 2015: Playhouse (Gateway Records), with Claus Waidtløw & The Orchestra
 2015: Kick off your shoes (Gateway Records), with Louise Bøttern
 2015: New strides (Gateway Records), with Tommy Høeg Quartet

References

External links 
 
 Jan Harbeck Quartet - Copenhagen Jazzfestival at YouTube

1975 births
Living people
Danish jazz saxophonists
Male saxophonists
Danish jazz composers
People from Aarhus
21st-century saxophonists
Male jazz composers
21st-century male musicians
Almost Big Band members